Lyttelton Peak is, at , the highest peak of the Cobham Range, Antarctica. It was mapped by the New Zealand Geological Survey Antarctic Expedition (1961–62) and given the family name of Charles Lyttelton, 10th Viscount Cobham, the then Governor-General of New Zealand.

==References==

Mountains of Oates Land